Marijuana Stop! is a 1971 film starring Zoe Laskari and Martha Karagianni.

Plot 
Three cousins inherit an old mansion in Plaka and each one have different plans on how they want to develop it. The two Athenian cousins Achilleas and Hippocrates are busy making their own plans while the third cousin arrives from abroad with plans of her own. The film also dealt with the hippie culture and its perception in Greek society as drug-using.

Cast 
Martha Karagianni ..... Despoina
Zoe Laskari ..... Kaiti Lagopoulou
Giorgos Pantzas ..... Giorgos Kehagias
Tolis Voskopoulos ...... himself
Chronis Exarhakos ...... Ippocratis
Kostas Kafasis ..... Spyros
Miranda Zafeiropoulou ..... Melita Kamvisi
Eleni Anousaki ..... Georgette
Dimitra Seremeti-Papachristou ..... Zozo
Nikol Kokkinou ..... Maria

Release 
The film premiered in Greece on 1 March 1971.

References

External links

1971 comedy films
1971 films
Greek comedy films
Finos Film films
Films directed by Giannis Dalianidis